Pinelli is an Italian surname, and may refer to:

Giuseppe Pinelli (1928–1969), anarchist
Antonia Bertucci-Pinelli (died c. 1640), Italian painter of the Baroque
Babe Pinelli (1895–1984), American baseball umpire
Bartolomeo Pinelli (1771–1835), illustrator and engraver
Dario Pinelli (born 1982), jazz guitarist
German Pinelli (1907–1996), Cuban journalist and actor
Gian Vincenzo Pinelli, 16th-century Italian humanist and botanist
Tullio Pinelli (1908–2009), screenwriter
 Luca Pinelli (1980), Italian Painter
It could also be a reference to:
 the Pinelli–Walckenaer Atlas, a 14th-century atlas.

See also

Prince of Belmonte

Surnames